This article lists historical events that occurred between 101–200 in modern-day Lebanon or regarding its people.

Administration

Roman emperor Hadrian (reigned 117–138) is said to have considered a division of the overly large province of Syria in 123–124 AD, but it was not until shortly after c. 194 AD that Septimius Severus (r. 193–211) actually undertook this, dividing the province into Syria Coele in the north and Phoenice in the south. The province was much larger than the area traditionally called Phoenicia: for example, cities like Emesa and Palmyra and the base of the Legio III Gallica in Raphanaea were now subject to governor in Tyre. Veterans of this military unit were settled in Tyre, which also received the rank of colonia.

War of Succession

After the death of the 2nd century Roman emperor Commodus, a civil war erupted, in which Berytus, and Sidon supported Pescennius Niger. While the city of Tyre  supported Septimius Severus, which led Niger to send Mauri javelin men and archers to sack the city. However, Niger lost the civil war, and Septimius Severus decided to show his gratitude for Tyre's support by making it the capital of Phoenice.

Propraetorial Imperial Legates of Phoenicia

Events

100s 

Lebanese Roman grammarian and critic Marcus Valerius Probus, dies in 105 AD.
Eudokia of Baalbek is beheaded in 1 March, 107 AD.

110s
Adrianus of Tyre, a sophist of ancient Athens who flourished under the emperors Marcus Aurelius and Commodus is born in 113 AD.
The 115 Antioch earthquake in which Beirut suffers significant damage, occurs on 13 December 115 AD.

130s

Marinus of Tyre, a Greek geographer, cartographer and mathematician, who founded mathematical geography and provided the underpinnings of Claudius Ptolemy's influential Geography, dies in 130 AD.
Roman Emperor Hadrian visits the city of Tyre in 130/131.

140s
Lebanese antiquarian writer of grammatical, lexical and historical works and writer of Phoenician history Philo of Byblos dies in 141 AD.

150s
Phoenician-born Pope Anicetus is elected as bishop of Rome .

170s
The famous Lebanese jurist Ulpian, Latin: Gnaeus Domitius Annius Ulpianus; one of the great legal authorities, is born in Tyre, possibly .

190s
Roman emperor Commodus dies on 31 December 192, leading to a war of succession, in which each Lebanese city took side of either Septimius Severus or Pescennius Niger.
Adrianus of Tyre dies in 192/193 AD.
In AD 193, Septimius Severus grants Baalbek ius Italicum rights.
Niger is defeated and beheaded in 194, ending the war of succession.
The Roman province of Phoenice is created .
Ti. Manilius Fuscus is governor of Phoenice, 194 AD.
El-Gouth, ancestor of the Saliba family in Bteghrine, and a Lebanese folk hero who was called "El-Saleeby" by an Arabian prince for his wars against Jews and idolaters in defense of the Christian faith, dies in Adraa of Hauran, 197 AD.
Q. Venidius Rufus Marius Maximus L. Calvinianus is governor of Phoenice, 198 AD.
Tyre becomes the capital of Phoenice, 198 AD.

Wildlife

The first attempt to conserve the Lebanese cedar was made during the 2nd century by the Roman emperor Hadrian; he created an imperial forest and ordered it marked by inscribed boundary stones, two of which are in the museum of the American University of Beirut. Material finds of this early type of wildlife conservation is provided by 200 inscriptions engraved on rocks all over the northern part of Mount Lebanon.

Architecture

2nd century CE Roman temple, Yanouh.
Temple of Bacchus, possibly during the reign of Roman Emperor Antoninus Pius (r. AD 138-161).
Triumphal arch at El-Buss.
Numerous 2nd century small temples and other sanctuaries in the vicinity of the temple district of Heliopolis, today's Baalbek, on the edge of the Bekaa.
Tyre Hippodrome.
the Great Court Complex of the temple of Jupiter, with its porticoes, exedrae, altars and basins.

Notes

References

Sources 
 
 Linda Jones Hall, Roman Berytus: Beirut in late antiquity (2004)

Lebanon
Centuries in Lebanon